Real Club Deportivo Mallorca, S.A.D. (Royal Sporting Club Mallorca), commonly known as Real Mallorca or just Mallorca is a Spanish professional football club based in Palma on the island of Majorca in the Balearic Islands. Founded on 5 March 1916, they currently compete in La Liga, holding home games at the Estadi Mallorca Son Moix with a 23,142-seat capacity.

The club had its peak in the late 1990s and early 2000s, reaching a best-ever 3rd place in La Liga in 1999 and 2001 and winning the Copa del Rey in 2003 following final defeats in 1991 and 1998. Mallorca also won the 1998 Supercopa de España and reached the 1999 UEFA Cup Winners' Cup Final.

Mallorca traditionally play in red shirts with black shorts and socks.

History

The early years 

Founded on 5 March 1916, what would later become RCD Mallorca was registered at the Spanish Football Federation under the name of Alfonso XIII Foot-Ball Club.

Weeks after its establishment, the club wasted little time forming the directors of Alfonso XIII FBC, headed by engineer Adolfo Vázquez Humasqué and eight other football fans. Their first stadium, the Buenos Aires field, was inaugurated with a competitive fixture against FC Barcelona just 20 days after registering further fast-tracked development. Despite the fixture ending in a disappointing 8–0 defeat, it was not long before King Alfonso XIII himself requested the royal adoption of ‘Real’ in the team's title, therefore becoming Real Sociedad Alfonso XIII Foot-Ball Club.
In 1917, the Catalan Federation granted Real Sociedad Alfonso XIII admission into the second-tier league championship as an unofficial champion of the Balearic Islands. Booking a place in the final, Los Bermellones went on to record their first title with a resounding 3–1 victory over Futbol Club Palafrugell, in Barcelona.

Until the 1930s, the board of directors managed to organise fixtures against peninsular clubs such as RCD Espanyol and Real Murcia, while also hosting rare exhibitions against foreign sides including: Ajax in 1923, Uruguay's national team in 1925, Chilean outfit Colo-Colo in 1927 and one of the Czech Republic's oldest teams, Prague Meteor, in 1930.

In 1931, following the establishment of the Second Spanish Republic which prohibited any form of reference to monarchy, the club was renamed to Club Deportivo Mallorca.

Although major fixtures and competitions across Spain were soon interrupted by the outbreak of the Civil War in 1936, the squad enjoyed a highly successful spell by winning every possible championship they entered into, as football on the island remained resistant to the deferral experienced throughout the country. When the war finally ended, matches with teams from the Peninsula were quick to resume and the Second Division was inaugurated, based on five groups of eight teams each.

It was during a period in the Second Division that, on 22 September 1945, the time had come to wave goodbye to Buenos Aires Field and up sticks to Es Fortí, a 16,000-maximum capacity stadium which would be called home for over half a century and undergo several expansions. A line-up featuring forward Sebastián Pocoví, defender Saturnino Grech and goalkeeper Antoni Ramallets beat Jerez 3–0 on the opening game of the new campaign the following day, with Carlos Sanz scoring Es Fortí's first goal in front of packed-out terraces. The title Es Fortí was short-lived however, with the board later changing the name of the stadium to Lluís Sitjar, in honour of the man who had driven the construction of the field.

During the 1949–1950 season, the Balearic club recovered their "Real" title, becoming Real Club Deportivo Mallorca

1960–1990

1990s and 2000s: Peak

In 1990–91, Mallorca reached the Copa del Rey final for the first time, losing by one goal to Atlético Madrid.

Argentine Héctor Cúper was hired as manager in 1997. In his first season, the club reached the 1998 Copa del Rey Final, and lost on penalties to FC Barcelona after a 1–1 draw in Mestalla. However, as Barcelona also won the league, Mallorca were their opponents in the 1998 Supercopa de España and won 3–1 on aggregate for their first major honour. Barcelona's double also meant Mallorca entered the 1998–99 UEFA Cup Winners' Cup, the final staging of the tournament – they lost the final 2–1 to Italy's S.S. Lazio at Villa Park.

In 1999, Mallorca also finished a best-ever 3rd and qualified for the first time to the UEFA Champions League, but were eliminated on the away goals rule by Molde FK of Norway before the group stage. Luis Aragonés matched 3rd place in 2001, before leaving for an Atlético Madrid still in the second tier. On 28 June 2003, Mallorca won the Copa del Rey with a 3–0 win over Recreativo de Huelva in the final in Elche; the goals were scored by Walter Pandiani and Samuel Eto'o (two).

2010s: Decline and return 

Mallorca was relegated from La Liga on the last day of the 2012–13 season. In January 2016, with the team at risk of relegation to the third tier, American investor Robert Sarver and former NBA player Steve Nash bought the club for just over €20 million.

On 4 June 2017, Mallorca fell into the third tier for the first time since 1981, with one game of the season still to play. A year later, they bounced back in the 2017–18 season after winning the play-off final against CF Rayo Majadahonda, under new manager Vicente Moreno. In June 2019, Mallorca secured a second consecutive promotion to the 2019–20 La Liga, following a 3–2 win on aggregate over Deportivo de La Coruña in the 2019 Segunda División play-offs – having lost the first game 2–0. However, they were relegated a year later. A year later, Mallorca bounced back to the top tier following an Almería defeat to Cartagena.

Season to season

30 seasons in La Liga
37 seasons in Segunda División
3 seasons in Segunda División B
12 seasons in Tercera División
7 seasons in Divisiones Regionales

Players

Current squad

Reserve team

Out on loan

Management and staff

Technical staff

Board of directors
President: Andy Kohlberg

Board of Directors Member: Robert Sarver

Board of Directors Member: Steve Nash

Board of Directors Member: Graeme Le Saux

Board of Directors Member: Utz Claassen

Honorary Secretary: Rosemary Mafuz

Sports directors
Football Director: Pablo Ortells

Steering committee
CFO: Alfonso Díaz

Head of Sales & Marketing: Joan Serra

Legality Department: Lidia Navarro

Head of Communications: Albert Salas

Ticketing & Social area: Román Albarrán

Presidents
Real Sociedad Alfonso XIII Football Club

 Adolfo Vázquez Humasqué (1916)
 Antoni Moner (1916–19)
 Josep Ramis d'Ayreflor (1919–24)
 Antoni Moner (1924–26)
 Lluís Sitjar (1926–27)
 Sebastià Sancho (1927)
 Manuel Villalonga (1927–29)
 Josep Ramis d'Ayreflor / Sebastià Sancho (1929–30)
 Antonio Parietti / Lluís Sitjar (1930–31)

Club Deportivo Mallorca

 Lluís Sitjar / Josep Sancho / Ramón Cavaller (1931–32)
 Miquel Seguí (1932–34)
 Llorenç Lladó / Andreu Homar (1934–35)
 Andreu Homar (1935–43)
 Lluís Sitjar (1943–46)
 Félix Pons Marqués (1946–47)

Real Club Deportivo Mallorca

 Joaquín Fuster / Andreu Homar / Joan de Vidal (1948–51)
 Antoni Buades / Josep Tous (1951)
 Antoni Buades / José María del Valle (1952)
 Llorenç Munar (1955)
 Jaume Rosselló (1956–61)
 Llorenç Munar (1961)
 Joan de Vidal (1964–66)
 Josep Barona (1966–67)
 Josep Barona / Pau Servera (1967–68)
 Pau Servera / Guillem Ginard (1969–70)
 Guillem Ginard / Josep Fandós (1970–71)
 Josep Fandós (1971–72)
 Joan de Vidal (1972–74)
 Joan de Vidal / Antoni Seguí (1974–75)
 Antonio Seguí / Joan Ferrer (1975–76)
 Guillem Ginard (1976-77)
 Guillem Ginard / Miquel Contestí (1977–78)
 Miquel Contestí (1978–92)
 Miquel Dalmau (1992–95)
 Bartomeu Beltrán (1995–98)
 Guillem Reynés (1998–00)
 Mateu Alemany (2000–05)
 Vicenç Grande (2005–08)
 Mateu Alemany (2008–09)
 Tomeu Vidal (2009–10)
 Josep Maria Pons (2010)
 Jaume Cladera (2010–12)

Honours

Domestic competitions
 Copa del Rey
Winners (1): 2002–03
Runners-up (2): 1990–91, 1997–98

 Supercopa de España
Winners (1): 1998
Runners-up (1): 2003

 Segunda División
Winners (2): 1959–60, 1964–65
Play-off Winners (1): 2019

 Segunda División B
Winners (2): 1980–81, 2017–18

International competitions
 UEFA Cup Winners’ Cup
Runners-up (1): 1998–99

Records

Team
Best La Liga position: Third (1998–99, 2000–01)
Record La Liga win: 7–1 v Recreativo de Huelva (h), 9 March 2008
Record La Liga defeat: 7–0 v Atlético Madrid (a), 7 Feb 1988
Fastest goal: 22 seconds -  Dani García v Real Oviedo, 21 Feb 1999.
Most goals scored in a season: 69 (2007–08)

Individual

Notable players

Most appearances

Top scorers

Pichichi Trophy
La Liga
 Daniel Güiza – 27 (2007–08)
Ricardo Zamora Trophy
La Liga
 Carlos Roa – 1998–99
Segunda División
 Badou Zaki – 1988–89

World Cup players
The following players have been selected by their country in the World Cup Finals, while playing for Mallorca.

  Zoran Vulić (1990)
  Iván Campo (1998)
  Carlos Roa (1998)
  Albert Luque (2002)
  Miguel Ángel Nadal (2002)
  Samuel Eto'o (2002)
  Pierre Webó (2010)
  Liassine Cadamuro-Bentaïba (2014)
  Lee Kang-in (2022)
  Predrag Rajković (2022)

Club information
Members: 12,107 (2020–21)
Total Attendance in La Liga: 205,828 (2019–20)
Average Attendance: 10,836 Spectators (2019–20)
Official shirt manufacturer: Nike
Official shirt sponsors: αGEL
Other sponsors:  Coca-Cola, CaixaBank, Estrella Damm, PayPal, Fibwi, juaneda, Air Europa, Specialized Bicycle Components, okmobility, Alua Hotels & Resorts

Stadium information
Name – Visit Mallorca Stadium
City – Palma de Mallorca
Capacity – 23,142
Inauguration – June 1999
Pitch size – 107 m x 69 m
Other Facilities: – Antonio Asensio Sports Complex (aka "Son Bibiloni")
Google Maps Location – Visit Mallorca Stadium

Affiliated teams 
 RCD Mallorca B - Reserve team

References

External links

Official website 
http://www.rcdmallorca.es/en
BDFutbol team profile
:ca:Trofeu Ciutat de Palma de Futbol

 
Segunda División clubs
Football clubs in the Balearic Islands
Association football clubs established in 1916
Copa del Rey winners
Organisations based in Spain with royal patronage
1916 establishments in Spain
Sport in Palma de Mallorca
La Liga clubs